William Wirt Winchester (June 22, 1837 – March 7, 1881) was the treasurer of the Winchester Repeating Arms Company, a position he held until his death in 1881.

Family
He was born on June 22, 1837, to Oliver Winchester and Jane Ellen Hope in Baltimore, Maryland. His siblings include: Ann Rebecca Winchester (1835-1864) who married Charles B. Dye; and Hannah Jane Winchester who married Thomas Gray Bennett. William married Sarah Lockwood Pardee  on September 30, 1862. The couple had one known child, Annie Pardee Winchester, born June 15, 1866, who died 6 weeks later on July 25 from marasmus. William died in New Haven, Connecticut, on March 7, 1881, of tuberculosis. He was buried in Evergreen Cemetery in New Haven. After his death, his wife, Sarah, became notable for  building Llanada Villa, later known as Winchester Mystery House.

Legacy
The William Wirt Winchester Hospital in West Haven, Connecticut, was established by his wife Sarah for the treatment of tuberculosis. The hospital was later sold and became a Veteran's Administration Hospital. The Private Pavilion at Yale New Haven Hospital was then renamed in his honour.

References

19th-century deaths from tuberculosis
American manufacturing businesspeople
1837 births
1881 deaths
Tuberculosis deaths in Connecticut
Winchester Repeating Arms Company
19th-century American businesspeople
Burials in Connecticut